Eva-Lena Gustavsson (born 1956) is a Swedish politician and former member of the Riksdag, the national legislature. A member of the Social Democratic Party, she represented Värmland County between March 2018 and September 2018. She had previously been a substitute member of the Riksdag for Jonas Gunnarsson between August 2017 and January 2018.

References

1956 births
21st-century Swedish women politicians
Living people
Members of the Riksdag 2014–2018
Members of the Riksdag from the Social Democrats
Women members of the Riksdag